Vahlkampfia inornata is a species of excavates. It has a PAS-positive surface layer and forms cysts in culture.

References

External links
TOLweb entry on genus
UniProt entry
EOL entry

Percolozoa
Species described in 1967